Benjamin Harrison Swig (born November 17, 1893 - October 31, 1980) was a real estate developer and a philanthropist active in Jewish and non-Jewish communities.

Biography 
Taunton, Massachusetts-born Benjamin Swig was the son of banker and politician Simon Swig and the father of Melvin Swig. After Simon died, Benjamin became treasurer of the Tremont Trust Company in Boston.

From 1925 to 1945, Benjamin Swig was a real estate operator. He was a partner of the real estate firm Swig, Weiler and Arnow that was founded in 1936, which became the Swig company.

In the 1940s, he moved to San Francisco, which he loved. He bought the Fairmont Hotel in 1945, and later the St. Francis Hotel.  

In 1956, he purchased the Mission Inn in Riverside. He sold 1,000 artworks and artifacts from the hotel to revitalize its finances to no avail.

In the early  1970s, the troubled elections at the Santa Clara University led the students to picket the Fairmont Hotel to protest against Benjamin Swig, who also served as SCU's Chairman of the board of trustees. After Swig repeatedly petitioned in his favor, the City of San Francisco granted the Key of the City to Sun Myung Moon in 1973. 

In 1977, his son Melvin created the Mae and Benjamin Swig Chair in Judaic Studies at the University of San Francisco, the first ever Jewish Studies chair and program at a Catholic university worldwide.

Other tenures 
 Member of the Board of directors of the American Joint Distribution Committee
 Member of the national Boards of the United Jewish Appeal
 Member of the Israel Bond Organization
 Member of the American Jewish Committee
 Member of the Zionist Organization of America
 Member of the Jewish Welfare Board
 Member of the Jewish Telegraphic Agency

Awards and recognition 
 Knighted twice by the Vatican
 Outstanding Civilian Service Medal

Personal life 
Benjamin Swig was married to Mae Aronovitz.

References

Bibliography 
 

American real estate businesspeople
Real estate and property developers
Jewish American philanthropists
1893 births
1980 deaths
20th-century American philanthropists
Swig family
20th-century American Jews